The Old City Waterworks is a historic site in Tallahassee, Florida. It is located at East Gaines and South Gadsden Streets. On January 31, 1979, it was added to the US National Register of Historic Places.

Prior to the Old City Waterworks, water was obtained from springs. By 1890 public works for water was needed for firefighting and the health of Tallahassee's citizens and the Old City Waterworks was built in 1904 on Gaines Street. The current building was remodeled in the 1920s to 1930s and closed in 1980.

Currently the building is under contract and planned for adaptive reuse as Amicus Brewing Ventures, a craft beer taproom and brewery.

References

External links

 Leon County listings at National Register of Historic Places
 Leon County listings at Florida's Office of Cultural and Historical Programs

Buildings and structures in Tallahassee, Florida
Historic buildings and structures in Leon County, Florida
Water supply pumping stations on the National Register of Historic Places
Water in Florida
Infrastructure completed in 1904
Industrial buildings and structures on the National Register of Historic Places in Florida
National Register of Historic Places in Tallahassee, Florida
History of Tallahassee, Florida
1904 establishments in Florida
Water supply infrastructure in Florida